Gower electoral ward is an electoral ward in Britain. It is a ward of the City and County of Swansea, and comprises the western part of the Gower Peninsula.  It lies within the UK Parliamentary constituency of Gower.

The electoral ward consists of some or all of the following villages and areas:  Cheriton, Horton, Knelston, Landimore, Llandewi, Llangennith, Llanmadoc, Llanrhidian, Middleton, Oldwalls, Overton, Oxwich Green, Oxwich, Penrice, Port Eynon, Reynoldston, Rhossili, Slade, Scurlage.

It also includes the communities of Ilston, "Llangennith, Llanmadoc and Cheriton", Llanrhidian Lower, Penrice, Swansea, Port Eynon, Reynoldston and Rhossili.

Neighbouring wards are Penclawdd to the north east, Fairwood to the east and Pennard to the south-east.

2022 boundary changes
Following recommendations by the Local Democracy and Boundary Commission for Wales the community of Ilston was transferred from the Gower ward to the Pennard ward, effective from the 2022 local elections.

2012 local council elections
Local council elections for Gower were held on 3 May 2012, along with wards in 21/22 local authorities in Wales.  The turn-out for Gower was 47.51%.  The results were:

Senedd
Gower Ward is part of the Gower constituency and returns one constituency Member of the Senedd to the Senedd.
It votes in the South Wales West region, which elects four list members.

References

External links
Gower News

Swansea electoral wards
Gower Peninsula